Ri Hyok-chon is a North Korean former footballer. He represented North Korea on at least fourteen occasions between 1988 and 1990, scoring four goals. At club level, he played for Wolmido.

Career statistics

International

International goals
Scores and results list North Korea's goal tally first, score column indicates score after each North Korea goal.

References

Date of birth unknown
Living people
North Korean footballers
North Korea international footballers
Association football midfielders
Wolmido Sports Club players
Year of birth missing (living people)